Drilus is a genus of beetles belonging to the family Elateridae.

List of species
 Drilus amabilis Schaufuss, 1867
 Drilus atripennis Pic, 1934
 Drilus attenuatus Pic, 1914
 Drilus basilewskyi Wittmer, 1962
 Drilus bicolor Schaufuss, 1867
 Drilus concolor Ahrens, 1812
 Drilus creticus Pic, 1905
 Drilus distincticollis Pic, 1907
 Drilus flavescens Olivier, 1790
 Drilus frontalis Schaufuss, 1867
 Drilus fulvicollis Audouin, 1824
 Drilus fulvicornis Kiesenwetter, 1859
 Drilus fulvitarsis Baudi di Selve, 1871
 Drilus funebris Reitter, 1894
 Drilus humeralis Pic, 1931
 Drilus iljini Barovskij, 1922
 Drilus impressiceps Pic, 1913
 Drilus iranicus Wittmer, 1967
 Drilus kandyanus Bourgeois, 1903
 Drilus latithorax Pic, 1902
 Drilus longulus Kiesenwetter, 1859
 Drilus mauritanicus Lucas, 1842
 Drilus novoathonius Sumakow, 1903
 Drilus obscuricornis Pic, 1899
 Drilus posticus Schaufuss, 1867
 Drilus ramosus Fairmaire, 1883
 Drilus rectus Schaufuss, 1867
 Drilus rufipes (Baudi, 1871)
 Drilus schwarzi Reitter, 1891
 Drilus striatus Pic, 1929
 Drilus testaceipennis Pic, 1918
 Drilus testaceipes Pic, 1933
 Drilus truquii (Baudi di Selve, 1871)

Gallery

References
 Biolib
 Fauna europaea
 A.G. Kirejtshuk, A. Herrmann  Beetles of genus Drilus
 R. Kundrata & L. Bocak 

Elateridae